Enkianthus is a genus of shrubs or small trees in the heath family (Ericaceae).  Its native range is in Asia, as far west as the eastern Himalayas, as far south as Indochina, and as far north and east as China and Japan.

This genus is considered cladistically the most basal member of the Ericaceae, that is, the descendant of the common ancestor of that Ericaceae that branched earliest from the rest of that family. It is classified as the sole member of the subfamily Enkianthoideae.

Species
Twelve to fifteen species are included in the genus by various authors. 
Species include:

Cultivation
Several species are found in cultivation, notably E. campanulatus, E. cernuus and E. perulatus. E. cernuus f. rubens (drooping red enkianthus) has gained the Royal Horticultural Society’s Award of Garden Merit.

References

Ericaceae
Ericaceae genera